Javier Martí Hernanz (born 11 January 1992) is a professional tennis player from Spain.  Javier qualified for the 2011 French Open by defeating Andrej Martin, Jaroslav Pospíšil, and Ryan Harrison. He has captured one ATP Challenger Tour doubles title at the 2012 Marbella Open.

His career high rank is 170, achieved on 23 April 2012.

He was the coach of Spanish tennis player Paula Badosa.

References

External links
 
 

1992 births
Living people
Tennis players from Madrid
Spanish male tennis players